Tuck Woolum is a former American football player and coach. He served as the head football coach at Union College in Barbourville, Kentucky from 1994 to 1998, compiling a record of 20–29–1.

Woolum played college football as a quarterback for the Eastern Kentucky Colonels. He was the starting quarterback when the team won the 1982 NCAA Division I-AA Football Championship Game.

Head coaching record

References

Year of birth missing (living people)
Living people
American football quarterbacks
Eastern Kentucky Colonels football coaches
Eastern Kentucky Colonels football players
Union (Kentucky) Bulldogs football coaches
Western Carolina Catamounts football coaches